RORC may refer to:
 Royal Ocean Racing Club, London club
  RORC gene, "RAR-related orphan receptor C", encodes the RORγ protein
 Russian Orthodox Old-Rite Church, Church of the Eastern Orthodox Old Believers tradition